Hannes Fink (born 6 October 1989) is an Italian former footballer who played his whole career for Südtirol.

Career
A  midfielder, Fink started his career with Italian fourth division side Südtirol, where he received interest from the Italian second division, helping them achieve promotion to the Italian third division. He played a total fifteen years for Südtirol, and retired by the end of the 2021–22 Serie C season, following his team's first ever promotion to Serie B.

References

External links
 
 

1989 births
Living people
Sportspeople from Bolzano
Germanophone Italian people
Italian footballers
Association football midfielders
Serie C players
F.C. Südtirol players
Footballers from Trentino-Alto Adige/Südtirol